Journal Media Group (formerly Journal Communications) was a Milwaukee, Wisconsin-based newspaper publishing company. The company's roots were first established in 1882 as the owner of its namesake, the Milwaukee Journal, and expanded into broadcasting with the establishment of WTMJ radio and WTMJ-TV, and the acquisition of other television and radio stations.

On April 1, 2015, the E. W. Scripps Company acquired Journal Communications, and spun out the publishing operations of both Scripps and Journal into a new company known as Journal Media Group. It is led by Timothy E. Stautberg—the former head of Scripps' newspaper business, joined by previous Journal CEO Stephen J. Smith as a chairman. In 2016, Journal Media Group was acquired by Gannett.

History
The Milwaukee Journal was started in 1882, in competition with four other English-language, four German- and two Polish-language dailies. It launched WTMJ-AM (620) in 1927, and WTMJ-TV (Channel 4) in 1947. The Journal Company, until then primarily owned by local interests, introduced an employee stock trust plan in 1937, and as a result most Journal stock was eventually held by its employees (under certain restrictions). A small bloc of Journal stock was given to Harvard to fund the Nieman Fellowship program for promising journalists, and another bloc was still held by the original owning families until the IPO.

The Milwaukee Sentinel, begun in 1837 as a weekly published by city co-founder Solomon Juneau, passed through the hands of several owners before being sold to the Hearst Corporation in 1924. Hearst operated the Sentinel until 1962, when, following a long and costly strike, it abruptly announced the closing of the paper. Although Hearst claimed that the paper had lost money for years, The Journal Company, concerned about the loss of an important voice (and facing questions about its own dominance of the Milwaukee media market), agreed to buy the Sentinel name, subscription lists, and goodwill associated with the name. In 1995 the Journal and Sentinel were consolidated. The new Journal Sentinel then became a seven-day morning paper. In 1964, Journal Communications bought a part interest in Perry Printing, a commercial printer specializing in printing magazines, catalogs and free-standing inserts for publications. A decade later, in 1974, it purchased the remaining shares of the company. In 1995, it sold the operation (which by then had about 1000 employees and sales of $123 million) to the Milhous Group of California.
 

In 1968, the Midwestern Relay cable transmission division of the Journal Company was developed out of broadcast-related expertise; in 1991, Midwestern Relay acquired Norlight, a fiber-optic private carrier, and adopted the Norlight name. On February 26, 2007 Journal Communications sold the regional telecommunications provider to privately held Q-Comm Corp of Delaware. Upon closing the transaction, Q-Comm terminated Jim Ditter, who had been president of Norlight since 1995, and chief financial officer Phillip Garvey. What is now known as the Journal Community Publishing Group began in Waupaca, Wisconsin in 1972 as a publishing and printing company called Add Inc. A majority interest was purchased by Journal Communications in 1981, and the remainder in 1986. In June 2007, Journal Communications sold off its JCP interests in Louisiana, Ohio, Connecticut and Vermont. The sales brought in a combined $30 million.

The company sold 11 community newspapers, five shoppers and two printing plants in Connecticut and Vermont to Hersam Acorn Newspapers. In Ohio, Journal sold eight shoppers, numerous specialty print products and the Advantage Press commercial printing business to Gannett Company. It also sold its Louisiana-based publishing business to a Target Media Partners affiliate. In 1999 Journal Communications acquired the Great Empire radio group (13 radio stations in 4 states). The corporation had its initial public offering of Class A shares in 2003. For decades, Journal Communications was criticized with concerns about being a media monopoly in the Milwaukee area. It created the now-defunct alternative papers MKE and ¡Aqui! Milwaukee to regain advertising dollars lost to local independents like the Shepherd Express and the Milwaukee Spanish Journal.

As Journal Media Group
On July 30, 2014, it was announced that Journal would be acquired by the E. W. Scripps Company in an all-stock transaction. Scripps would retain the two firms' broadcasting properties, while both the Scripps and Journal print properties would be spun off as Journal Media Group. The FCC approved the deal on December 12, 2014, and it was approved by shareholders on March 11, 2015. The merger and spin-off were finalized on April 1, 2015; Stephen J. Smith was replaced as CEO by Timothy E. Stautberg—the former head of Scripps' newspaper operation. Although Journal Media Group was based at Journal Communications' old headquarters in Milwaukee, the latter company was legally defunct, having been absorbed into Scripps and renamed "Desk BC Merger, LLC".

On October 7, 2015, it was announced that Gannett would acquire Journal Media Group for $280 million. The deal was finalized on April 8, 2016.

Former assets

Newspapers 
 Milwaukee Journal Sentinel (Milwaukee, Wisconsin)
 Ventura County Star (Camarillo, California)
 Redding Record Searchlight (Redding, California)
 Naples Daily News (Naples, Florida)
 Treasure Coast Newspapers:
 The Stuart News (Stuart, Florida)
 Indian River Press Journal (Vero Beach, Florida)
 The St. Lucie News-Tribune (Fort Pierce, Florida)
 Evansville Courier & Press (Evansville, Indiana)
 The Gleaner (Henderson, Kentucky)
 The Anderson Independent-Mail (Anderson, South Carolina)
 The Knoxville News-Sentinel (Knoxville, Tennessee)
 The Commercial Appeal (Memphis, Tennessee)
 The Abilene Reporter-News (Abilene, Texas)
 Corpus Christi Caller-Times (Corpus Christi, Texas)
 San Angelo Standard-Times (San Angelo, Texas)
 Times Record News (Wichita Falls, Texas)
 Kitsap Sun (Bremerton, Washington) (daily newspaper)

Community Publishing Group 
Florida
 Clay Today, Orange Park
 Clay County Leader, Clay County
 Ponte Vedra Recorder, Ponte Vedra Beach
 St. John's Recorder, Fruit Cove
Wisconsin

 The Bay Viewer, Milwaukee
 Brookfield News, Brookfield
 Clintonville Tribune-Gazette, Clintonville
 Cudahy-St. Francis Reminder-Enterprise, Cudahy
 Elm Grove Elm Leaves, Elm Grove
 Franklin Hub, Franklin
 Germantown Banner-Press, Germantown
 Greendale Village Life, Greendale
 Greenfield Observer, Greenfield
 Hales Corners Village Hub, Hales Corners
 Iola Herald, Iola
 Kettle Moraine Index, Dousman
 Lake Country Reporter, Hartland
 Manawa Advocate, Manawa
 Merrill Foto News, Merrill
 Menomonee Falls News, Menomonee Falls
 Mequon-Thiensville Courant, Mequon
 Mukwonago Chief, Mukwonago
 Muskego Sun, Muskego
 New Berlin Citizen, New Berlin
 New London Press Star, New London
 North Shore Herald, Fox Point
 The North Star Journal, Rhinelander
 Oak Creek Pictorial, Oak Creek
 Oconomowoc Focus, Oconomowoc
 South Milwaukee Voice Graphic, South Milwaukee
 Sussex Sun, Sussex
 Wauwatosa News-Times, Wauwatosa
 West Allis Star, West Allis

Other holdings
 IPC Print Services
 PrimeNet

Television stations 
Stations are arranged alphabetically by state and by city of license.
 (**) – Indicates that it was built and signed on by Journal.

Note:
1 Owned by Ace TV, Inc., Journal operated WACY through a local marketing agreement from 2004 until it acquired the station outright in 2012.

Radio stations 
Boise, Idaho
 KJOT
 KQXR
 KRVB
 KTHI-FM
 KGEM

Leavenworth, Kansas
KQRC-FM

Knoxville, Tennessee
 WCYQ
 WNOX
 WKHT
 WWST

Milwaukee, Wisconsin
 WLWK-FM
 WTMJ

Nebraska City, Nebraska
 KBBX-FM

Newton, Kansas
 KKGQ

Omaha, Nebraska
 KEZO
 KKCD
 KQCH
 KSRZ
 KXSP
 KOTK
 KOMJ

Ontario, Oregon
 KSRV-FM
 KSRV

Powell, Tennessee
 WJBE

Caldwell, Idaho
 KCID

Springfield, Missouri
 KRVI
 KSGF AM/KSGF-FM
 KSPW
 KTTS-FM

Tucson, Arizona
 KFFN - 1490 AM - ESPN/Sports Radio
 KTGV - 106.3 FM - Rhythmic Oldies
 KMXZ - 94.9 FM - Adult Contemporary/AC
 KQTH - 104.1 FM - News/Talk

Tulsa, Oklahoma
 KTSB
 KVOO-FM
 KXBL
 KHTT
 KBEZ

Wichita, Kansas
 KFDI-FM
 KFTI
 KFXJ
 KICT-FM
 KYQQ

Wausau, Wisconsin
 WIFC
 WSAU-AM

Controversies
Before its merger with Journal, the papers of E. W. Scripps were known for having several controversies within the newspapers it ran.

Hugo Zacchini performed a human cannonball act in 1972 at the Geauga County Fair in Burton, Ohio. Scripps television station WEWS-TV recorded and aired the entire act against his wishes and without compensating him, as was required by Ohio law. In Zacchini v. Scripps-Howard Broadcasting Co., the U.S. Supreme Court ruled that the First Amendment did not shield the broadcaster from liability from common law copyright claims.

The Commercial Appeal posted a controversial database listing Tennessee residents with permits to carry handguns in 2008. The database is a public record in Tennessee, but had not previously been posted online.

Scripps owns and operates the Ventura County Star, which has faced many complaints involving its circulation practices rather than its editorial content. As of April 2, 2011, the Better Business Bureau listed ten (10) separate "significant" complaints from the previous three years, of which two alleged the company made unauthorized debits from customers' checking accounts, four alleged problems obtaining refunds, two alleged the company harassed a customer or former customer, two alleged improper billing, and two alleged delivery continuing after customers tried to cancel. (The total number of allegations does not add to the total number of complaints because two complaints made multiple allegations.)

In May 2013, Scripps News Service discovered and published a security breach on the websites of Oklahoma-based TerraCom Inc. and an affiliate, YourTel America Inc. in which the personal information of tens of thousands of low-income Americans was publicly exposed. In response, the two companies accused Scripps of "hacking" and of violations of the Computer Fraud and Abuse Act. The Illinois Attorney General Lisa Madigan subsequently announced an investigation into the two companies.

Board of directors

 Steven J. Smith - Chairman of the Board and Chief Executive Officer, Journal Communications
 David Drury - President & Chief Executive Officer, Poblocki Sign Company, LLC
 David Meissner - Former Chairman, Public Policy Forum, Inc.
 Jonathan Newcomb - Senior Advisor, Coady Diemar Partners
 Roger Peirce - Retired Vice Chairman & CEO, Super Steel Products Corporation
 Ellen Siminoff - CEO, Shmoop, and Chairman, Efficient Frontier
 Mary Ellen Stanek - Managing Director & Chief Investment Officer, Baird Advisors, Robert W. Baird & Co. Inc
 Owen Sullivan - CEO, Right Management
 Jeanette Tully - President and CEO, Radiovisa Corporation

References

 
Defunct mass media companies of the United States
Defunct newspaper companies of the United States
Defunct broadcasting companies of the United States
Defunct companies based in Milwaukee

Mass media companies established in 1882
Mass media companies disestablished in 2016
1882 establishments in Wisconsin
2016 disestablishments in Wisconsin
Companies formerly listed on the New York Stock Exchange
Gannett
E. W. Scripps Company
2015 mergers and acquisitions
2016 mergers and acquisitions